"Breathe in Now" is a song by Australian alternative rock group George. It was released as the third single from their debut studio album Polyserena (2002).

George performed the song live on Rove Live.

Track listing
CD single (020702)
 "Breathe in Now" – 3:52
 "Dublin Song" – 3:08
 "Quiet Day" – 2:56
 "Not Me, Not You" – 3:42
 "Special Ones" (live) – 3:51

Charts

References

George (band) songs
2001 songs
2002 singles